Poecilia elegans, the elegant molly, is a species of freshwater fish in the family Poeciliidae. It is endemic to the Dominican Republic.

References

elegans
Fish described in 1948
Taxa named by Ethelwynn Trewavas
Fish of the Dominican Republic
Endemic fauna of the Dominican Republic